Pakubuwono X (also transliterated Pakubuwana X, sometimes abbreviated PBX; Surakarta, November 29, 1866 – Surakarta, February 22, 1939) was the tenth Susuhunan (ruler of Surakarta).

Birth 
His birth name was Raden Mas Sayyidin Malikul Kusna, son of Pakubuwono IX and his wife Kanjeng Raden Ayu Kustiyah.

Politics
His reign corresponded with the political changes happening in the Dutch East Indies at the time, in particular the growth of local indigenous political organizations such as Budi Utomo and Sarekat Islam of which he and the royal family were patrons.

Family
Pakubuwono X was known to have many concubines, but his main consort was GKR Hemas, the daughter of Sultan Hamengkubuwono VII of Yogyakarta. He was also known major contributor to improvements at the Royal Graveyard of Imogiri, where he himself is buried.

Motorcar 
Even more than women Pakubuono X, loved motorcars. In 1894 he purchased a Benz phaeton for 10,000 guilders, an amount of money a contract coolie  could make in three centuries. So he became the first motorist in the Dutch Colonial Empire, two years in advance of the first one in the Netherlands mainland. In effect it made him a pioneer of the Indonesian automobile industry as the first car driver and owner of the territories that make up the current Republic.

Death and funeral train

After PB X's death, his coffin was transported between Surakarta and Yogyakarta by a NIS train. The remaining journey between Yogyakarta and Imogiri was by royal carriage. His coffin's trip to Imogiri was one of the most photographed royal funeral processions of rulers of his era.

See also
Pakubuwono

Notes

Further reading
Miksic, John N. (general ed.), et al. (2006)  Karaton Surakarta. A look into the court of Surakarta Hadiningrat, central Java (First published: 'By the will of His Serene Highness Paku Buwono XII'. Surakarta: Yayasan Pawiyatan Kabudayan Karaton Surakarta, 2004)  Marshall Cavendish Editions  Singapore  

1866 births
1939 deaths
Burials at Imogiri
Susuhunan of Surakarta
Recipients of the Grand Cross of the Order of Leopold II
Knights Grand Cross of the Royal Order of Cambodia
Commanders of the Order of the Dannebrog
National Heroes of Indonesia
Indonesian royalty